The Men's 48 kg powerlifting event at the 2004 Summer Paralympics was competed  on 20 September. It was won by Morteza Dashti, representing .

Final round

20 Sept. 2004, 13:45

References

M